Nanchang Bayi Stadium (Simplified Chinese: 南昌八一体育场) is a multi-use stadium in Nanchang, China.  It is currently used mostly for football matches and athletics events. This stadium's capacity is 26,000 people.

External links
Stadium picture

Footnotes

Sports venues in Jiangxi
Football venues in China
Buildings and structures in Nanchang
Sport in Nanchang